Chromogobius is a small genus of gobies native to the eastern Atlantic Ocean through the Mediterranean and Adriatic seas to the Black Sea.

Species
There are currently three recognized species in this genus:
 Chromogobius britoi Van Tassell, 2001 (Brito's goby)
 Chromogobius quadrivittatus (Steindachner, 1863) (Chestnut goby)
 Chromogobius zebratus (Kolombatović, 1891) (Kolombatovic's goby)

References

 
Gobiinae